The white trevally (Pseudocaranx dentex), also known as striped jack,) is a jack of the family Carangidae widespread in tropical and warm temperate areas between 40°N and 47°S, in the Atlantic, Mediterranean, Indian, and Pacific Oceans. It has a deep body and a greenish colour with metallic overtones and a dark spot above the gills. The fins are yellow. Trevally are strong fighters and the flesh is good to eat if a little dry.  It is often used as cut bait. Its maximum size is about 120 cm.

In New Zealand, this trevally is known by the Māori as araara, and is generally confined to waters north of Cook Strait, although it sometimes reaches as far south as Otago in the summer.

Relationship with humans 
The IGFA all-tackle world record for the species sits at 15.25 kg (33 lb 9oz) caught near Tokyo, Japan in 1998.

References

External links
 

Pseudocaranx
Fish of Hawaii
Fish described in 1801